William Moore (26 August 1823 – 9 August 1914) was an Australian politician, President of the Tasmanian Legislative Council from 1889 to 1894.

Moore was born on the Isle of Man. In 1871 he was elected to the Tasmanian House of Assembly as the member for Wellington, serving until 1877, when he transferred to the Legislative Council, winning the seat of Mersey. Moore was Minister of Lands and Works in the Alfred Kennerley Ministry from August 1873 to July 1876, and Colonial Secretary in the Philip Fysh and William Giblin Governments from August 1877 to March 1878. From October 1879 to August 1884 he held the same position in Giblin's second Ministry.

Moore transferred to the Upper House seat of Russell in 1885 and was President of the Council from 1889 to 1894. Moore retired in 1909; he died in Hobart on 9 August 1914.

References

1823 births
1914 deaths
Members of the Tasmanian House of Assembly
Members of the Tasmanian Legislative Council
Presidents of the Tasmanian Legislative Council
Manx people
Manx emigrants to Australia